Elections in Dominica have been taking place since 1832. Dominica elects on national level a legislature. The House of Assembly has 32 members, 21 members elected for a five-year term in single-seat constituencies, 9 appointed senators, the Speaker and 1 ex officio member. a head of state - the president -  is elected by the House of Assembly.

Dominica has a two-party system, which means that there are two dominant political parties, with extreme difficulty for anybody to achieve electoral success under the banner of any other party. Dominica was once a three-party system until the Dominica Labour Party and the greatly diminished Dominica Freedom Party formed a coalition government.  The DFP has failed to acquire any seats for two elections straight, leaving the United Workers' Party as the only opposition to the DLP.

Latest elections

See also
 Electoral calendar
 Electoral system

Notes

References
 Matthias Catón: "Dominica" in: Elections in the Americas. A Data Handbook, vol. 1, ed. by Dieter Nohlen. Oxford University Press, Oxford, 2005: pp. 223–237

External links 

Adam Carr's Election Archive
 Vote Commonwealth of Dominica elections, KnowledgeWalk online
 Election Profile - Commonwealth of Dominica, International Foundation for Electoral Systems (IFES)